Devan may refer to:

People
Devan (actor) (born 1952), South Indian film actor and politician
Devan (writer) (1913–1957), Tamil writer
Devan Bailey (born 1989), English basketball player
Devan Carroll (born 1988), American footballer
Devan Downey (born 1987), American basketball player
Devan Dubnyk (born 1986), Canadian ice hockey player
Devan Ekambaram, Indian-American playback singer, actor, and composer
Devan Nair (1923–2005), third President of Singapore
Devan Wray (born 1979), Canadian lacrosse player and coach
Aishwarya Devan (born 1993), Indian actress
Bill Devan (1909–1966), Scottish footballer
István Déván (1891–1977), Hungarian Olympic athlete and skier
Janadas Devan (born 1954), Singaporean journalist
K. Devan (born 1951), Malaysian footballer and manager
M. V. Devan (1928–2014), Indian artist, critic, and orator

Other uses
Devan (film), a 2002 Tamil action film directed by Arun Pandian
Devan v. Ernst & Young LLP, a 1998 lawsuit in Baltimore City Circuit Court

See also
 Devon (disambiguation)